In Greek mythology, Mesthles (Ancient Greek: Μέσθλης) was one of the Trojan Leaders.

Family 
Mesthles was the son of Talaemenes and a Gygaean nymph (Gygaea). He was the brother of Antiphus.

Mythology 
Mesthles and his brother were the captains of the Maeonians who participated in the Trojan War. The Meiones were Lydian people whose city is today's Sardis.

Notes

References 

 Apollodorus, The Library with an English Translation by Sir James George Frazer, F.B.A., F.R.S. in 2 Volumes, Cambridge, MA, Harvard University Press; London, William Heinemann Ltd. 1921. ISBN 0-674-99135-4. Online version at the Perseus Digital Library. Greek text available from the same website.
 Homer, The Iliad with an English Translation by A.T. Murray, Ph.D. in two volumes. Cambridge, MA., Harvard University Press; London, William Heinemann, Ltd. 1924. . Online version at the Perseus Digital Library.
 Homer, Homeri Opera in five volumes. Oxford, Oxford University Press. 1920. . Greek text available at the Perseus Digital Library.
Tzetzes, John, Allegories of the Iliad translated by Goldwyn, Adam J. and Kokkini, Dimitra. Dumbarton Oaks Medieval Library, Harvard University Press, 2015. 

Trojan Leaders
People of the Trojan War